The Tișița (in its upper course also: Tișița Mare) is a right tributary of the river Putna in Romania. It discharges into the Putna downstream from Lepșa.

References

Rivers of Romania
Rivers of Vrancea County